The 2011–12 Houston Rockets season was the 45th season of the franchise in the National Basketball Association (NBA) and the 41st based in Houston. This was the first season since the 2001-02 season that Yao Ming was not on the roster as he retired during  the lockout. The off-season saw team draft a pair of first round picks, forward Marcus Morris from Kansas was drafted 14th overall and Madrid sensation Nikola Mirotić was drafted 23rd overall. Forward and 3-point specialist Chandler Parsons from Florida was taken with the 38th pick in the second round. The season is most memorable when ex-Celtic and former Timberwolves general manager Kevin McHale was hired to be their new head coach for the upcoming season. The Rockets finished with a 34–32  record, missing the playoffs.

Key dates
June 23: The 2011 NBA Draft took place at Prudential Center in Newark, New Jersey.
July 9: Yao Ming announced his retirement from professional basketball.

Draft picks

Roster

Pre-season
Due to the 2011 NBA lockout negotiations, the programmed pre-season schedule, along with the first two weeks of the regular season were scrapped, and a two-game pre-season was set for each team once the lockout concluded.

|- style="background:#cfc;"
| 1
| December 17
| San Antonio
| 
| Luis Scola (20)
| Jordan Hill (13)
| Kyle Lowry (5)
| Toyota Center12,859
| 1–0
|- style="background:#fbb;"
| 2
| December 21
| @ San Antonio
| 
| Marcus Morris (20)
| Jordan Hill (8)
| Jonny Flynn (6)
| AT&T Center17,323
| 1–1

Regular season

Standings

Record vs. opponents

References

Houston Rockets seasons
Houston Rockets